Bohrer Park is a park located in St. Louis County, Missouri. The park is owned and administered by the St. Louis County Department of Parks and Recreation.

History 
St. Louis County bought site in 1958 and 1960. The sale was funded by a bond issue and the sale of land to the Missouri Department of Transportation for development of Interstate 270. Between 1963 and 1981 the park included a "Lion's Pit" which was built by the local branch of the Lion's Club. The pit was removed because it was being used after hours.

Name 
The park is named after George E. Bohrer, who served in the U.S. Army in World War II. After the war, Bohrer served in the Missouri House of Representatives from 1946 to 1952 and in the St. Louis County Council from 1956 until his death in 1960.

Amenities 
The park includes the following:

 A playground
 Tennis courts
 A fountain play area
 Athletic fields
 A reservable shelter

References 

Parks in Missouri